= World Saiva Council =

Nonprofit organization focusing on principles of Saivism

- Founded: 29 February 1992
- Founder: Swami Siva Nandhi Adilcalilar
- Type: Non-profit organization
- Purpose: Promotion and preservation of Shaivism and Hindu cultural heritage
- Location: Chennai, India
- Region served: Worldwide (branches in India, UK, Sri Lanka, South Africa, Canada, Malaysia, Mauritius, Australia, France, Switzerland, Singapore)
- Method: Religious guidance, cultural events, international conferences, empowerment programs

World Saiva Council is a non-profit organisation which articulates the fundamental guidelines and instructions complying with the religion of Hinduism and Shaivism. The main intention of World Saiva Council is to promote and safeguard the Shaivism and its cultural heritage.

== History ==
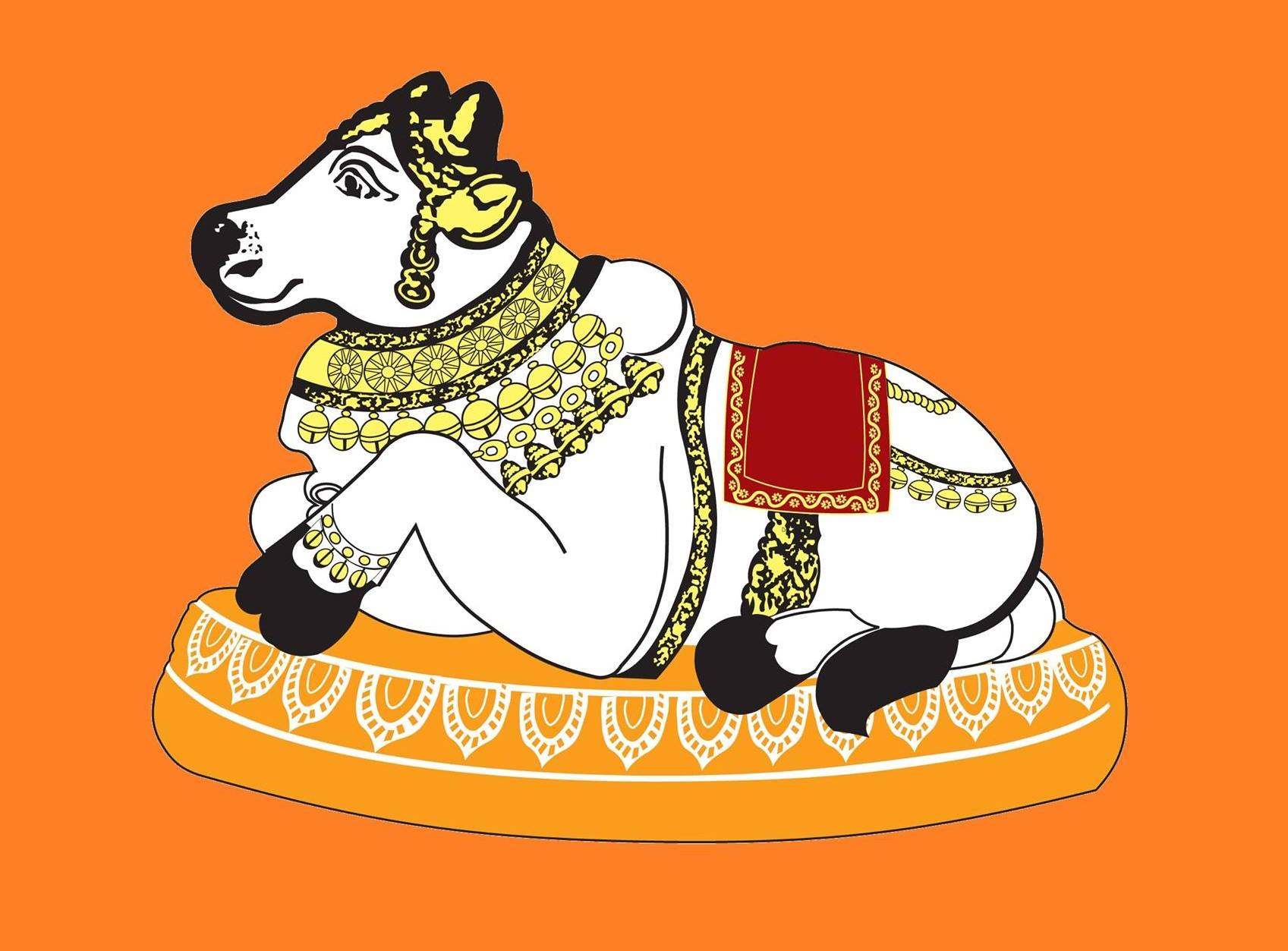
World Saiva Council predominantly uses Nandi flag during Maha Sivarathri

World Saiva Council was founded by Swami Siva Nandhi Adilcalilar on 29 February 1992 at the Saiva Siddhantha Peru Mandram, Mylapore, Chennai and the announcement regarding the foundation of World Saiva Council was officially made during a public meeting with international delegates. It was during the 1992 meeting, that the World Saiva Council initiative was coined and was materialised when the delegates collaborated to incorporate a change in Saivism in the context of overcoming significant obstacles through the implementation of proactive measures with clear action plan for the foreseeable future.

Prior to the death of its founding father, Swami Siva Nandhi Adilcalilar, the branches affiliated with World Saiva Council were established in 11 countries including India, the UK, Sri Lanka, South Africa, Canada, Malaysia, Mauritius, Australia, France, Switzerland and Singapore. Since then, international conferences have been held in all 11 countries to discuss matters related to topics on preserving Saivism and the traditional Hindu culture. The World Saiva Council adapted Nandi flag as the official flag of the organization and it has been traditionally used by Hindu devotees as an identity symbol to observe the Maha Sivarathri Day. The banners mentioning the World Saiva Council slogan are also displayed during the occasion of Maha Sivarathri at various Hindu temples in different parts of the world. The Nandi flags are hoisted at various Hindu temples and Hindu based religious organisations during the Maha Sivarathri. The World Saiva Council also issues a special note with the emblem of Nandi logo to mark the Maha Sivarathri.

In 2023, a new segment focusing on empowerment of women was initiated through the official launch of the women's forum adjoining with the World Saiva Council at the Saiva Sithantha Sungum Temple Hall in Westcliff, Chatsworth.
